The Northern 10 Athletic Conference (or Northern 10/N10) is an OHSAA athletic conference that is currently made up of eight schools from northern Ohio and began athletic competition in 2014.  Six schools (Buckeye Central, Bucyrus, Colonel Crawford, Upper Sandusky, and Wynford) came from the North Central Conference, three (Carey, Mohawk, and Seneca East) came from the Midland Athletic League, and one (Ridgedale) came from the Mid-Ohio Athletic Conference.  Riverdale was also supposed to come over from the North Central Conference, but had its membership terminated when it accepted an invitation to the Blanchard Valley Conference. The creation of the league effectively disbanded the North Central Conference as its four remaining members would eventually agree to join other leagues by 2014.  .

In April 2013, Blanchard Valley Conference President Traci Conley indicated the BVC wanted to expand to 14 members and sent an invitation to Riverdale High School, which is located in Hancock County, Ohio with most BVC schools.  Riverdale accepted the BVC's invitation on April 22, 2013.  In June 2013, the N10 invited Upper Sandusky to take Riverdale's place in 2014, after the Rams had agreed to join the MOAC.  Upper Sandusky accepted the offer and joined the N10 in all sports except football, which jumped over in 2015.

In December 2014, Crestline announced that it would leave to join the Mid-Buckeye Conference in 2015-16, which they felt would be a more competitive league for the Bulldogs.  This will leave the N10 with nine members again for the time being.

In early 2017, Ridgedale announced that they would not play a league schedule for football during the 2017 season.  Citing low numbers, frequent injuries, and numerous losses over the last few years, the Rockets began to play an independent schedule against other area teams beginning in 2017.  Preparing for the future, The N10 decided to go forward with an eight-team league schedule (playing seven league games during football weeks 4-10) beginning in 2018.

In October 2019, Ridgedale's school board voted 3-2 to leave the N10 and join the Northwest Central Conference beginning with the 2021-2022 school year.

Members

Former Members

League Championships

Boys Championships

Girls Championships

Links

Ohio high school sports conferences